The 2014 Women's Twenty20 Cup, known for sponsorship reasons as the 2014 NatWest Women's Twenty20 Cup, was the 6th cricket Women's Twenty20 Cup tournament. It took place in July and August, with 40 teams taking part: 36 county teams, alongside Scotland, Ireland, Wales and Netherlands. Nottinghamshire Women won the Twenty20 Cup, achieving their first title. The tournament ran alongside the 50-over 2014 Women's County Championship.

Competition format

Teams played matches within a series of divisions, across two rounds of groupings. Matches were played using a Twenty20 format.

The championship worked on a points system with positions within the divisions being based on the total points. Points were awarded as follows:

Win: 4 points. 
Tie: 2 points. 
Loss: 0 points.
Abandoned/Cancelled: 1 point.

Teams 
The 2014 Women's Twenty20 Cup was divided into four divisions: Divisions One, Two and Three with nine teams each and Division Four with 13 teams. Each Division was divided into regional groups of 3 teams apiece, with each team playing each other twice (apart from Division 4B, which had four teams, and each team played each other once). 

Based on placings in the first round, teams then progressed to tiered divisions in round two (or tiered matches, in Division Four): for example, the winner of Group 1A progressed to Round 2 Group 1A, with the runners-up being placed in Round 2 Group 1B and third place moving to Round 2 Group 1C. The winners of Round 2 Group 1A were crowned champions, and placings further down determined promotion and relegation. The teams were initially divided into groups as follows:

Division One

Round 1

Group A

 Source: ECB Women's Twenty20 Cup

Group B

 Source: ECB Women's Twenty20 Cup

Group C

 Source: ECB Women's Twenty20 Cup

Round 2

Group A

 Source: ECB Women's Twenty20 Cup

Group B

 Source: ECB Women's Twenty20 Cup

Group C

 Source: ECB Women's Twenty20 Cup

Division Two

Round 1

Group A

 Source: ECB Women's Twenty20 Cup

Group B

 Source: ECB Women's Twenty20 Cup

Group C

 Source: ECB Women's Twenty20 Cup

Round 2

Group A

 Source: ECB Women's Twenty20 Cup

Group B

 Source: ECB Women's Twenty20 Cup

Group C

 Source: ECB Women's Twenty20 Cup

Division Three

Round 1

Group A

 Source: ECB Women's Twenty20 Cup

Group B

 Source: ECB Women's Twenty20 Cup

Group C

 Source: ECB Women's Twenty20 Cup

Round 2

Group A

 Source: ECB Women's Twenty20 Cup

Group B

 Source: ECB Women's Twenty20 Cup

Group C

 Source: ECB Women's Twenty20 Cup

Division Four

Round 1

Group A

 Source: ECB Women's Twenty20 Cup

Group B

 Source: ECB Women's Twenty20 Cup

Group C

 Source: ECB Women's Twenty20 Cup

Group D

 Source: ECB Women's Twenty20 Cup

Round 2
The teams in Division Four then played in a series of placing matches, to determine finishing positions from 1st to 13th, with the top two being promoted. The teams placed as follows:

Statistics

Most runs

Source: CricketArchive

Most wickets

Source: CricketArchive

Notes

References

Women's Twenty20 Cup
 
2014 in Scottish cricket
cricket
cricket